Frozen Planet II is a 2022 British nature documentary series co-produced by the BBC and The Open University as a sequel to Frozen Planet, which was first broadcast in 2011. The series is presented and narrated by Sir David Attenborough with the music composed by Hans Zimmer, Adam Lukas and James Everingham, including a theme featuring the vocals of singer-songwriter Aurora.

It was filmed by the BBC Natural History Unit. The production team, which includes executive producer Mark Brownlow and series producer Elizabeth White, was previously responsible for the award-winning series Blue Planet II (2017).

Whereas the original Frozen Planet series focused on life and the environment in both of the polar regions, this follow-up series broadened the scope to include the entire cryosphere, whilst also placing a greater emphasis on the threats the inhabitants of these regions face as a result of climate change.

Production 
The series took four and a half years to produce, and being filmed over ten years after its predecessor, Frozen Planet II, took advantage of significant advances in camera, microphone and drone technology; using drones to capture live avalanches and disintegrating glaciers.Each episode, except for the last, concludes with a segment entitled Out in the Cold that highlights how some of the sequences in each episode were made.

Broadcast

British Television 
The series saw its British television debut on BBC One, BBC One HD and BBC iPlayer on Sunday 11 September 2022 in the 8pm to 9pm timeslot.

International 
Frozen Planet II has been licensed worldwide by various broadcasters including BBC America in North America, ZDF in Germany, France Télévisions in France, Migu Video in China, Friday! in Russia, Mediaset in Italy, KBS in South Korea, and the Nine Network in Australia.

On Sunday 18 September 2022 the series saw its network debut on BBC Earth Asia covering the nations of Brunei, Cambodia, Hong Kong, Indonesia, Laos, Malaysia, Mongolia, Myanmar, Philippines, Singapore, South Korea, Taiwan, Thailand and Vietnam.

Episodes

Reception

Critical reception 
Reviewers at The Guardian, The Daily Telegraph and The Times all awarded the opening episode a maximum five stars, with Lucy Mangan of the former stating "You cannot stay unengaged, you cannot remain unmoved by the sight of nature in all her glory". The opening episode was also given five stars by Rachel Sigee at the I stating "Ending exactly as it should – with a call to arms – its scale and finesse must not be taken for granted, and its message must be heard". In contrast Nick Hilton at her sister paper The Independent awarded the opening episode just 3 stars opining that "this feels more like a greatest hits compilation than a documentary that has something new, and pressing, to say".

Merchandise

Books 
Frozen Planet II accompanies the TV series and was released in hardcover format on 11 September 2022 to coincide with the series debut in the UK. It is written by the series producers Mark Brownlow and Elizabeth White. The UK version is published by BBC Books.

A 64-page children's book to accompany the series, also called Frozen Planet II, will be released in hardcover format on 6 October 2022. Written by Leisa Stewart-Sharpe, it is illustrated by Kim Smith, with a foreword by Chris Packham. The UK version is published by BBC Books.

Open University poster 
A Frozen Planet II poster was produced in collaboration with and distributed for free by The Open University.

Music

Take Me Back Home 
On 22 August 2022, the BBC announced that the Cuban-born American singer and songwriter Camila Cabello had collaborated with composer Hans Zimmer to write and record a new song entitled Take Me Back Home. The accompanying press release highlighted that it marked the first time a completely new song had been written to support a BBC One natural history landmark release (previously Radiohead had rerecorded "Bloom" for Blue Planet II and Sia being credited as co-writer for the original song "Out there" which was used on the series Seven Worlds, One Planet).

In a press release, Camila Cabello said: "...Frozen Planet II is stunning and Sir David’s narration is deeply powerful as we try to protect these incredible ecosystems from global warming. I’m grateful to be able to lend my voice to such an inspiring series."

The song was used as the soundtrack for a Frozen Planet II extended trailer released by the BBC to promote the series and saw its debut on 26 August 2022.

Soundtrack 

The musical score and songs featured in the series are composed by Hans Zimmer, Adam Lukas and James Everingham for Bleeding Fingers Music. Additionally Anže Rozman (score arranger) is credited alongside Zimmer for the opening titles. Russell Emanuel serves as score producer alongside Greg Rappaport and Marsha Bowe as score supervisors. Hans Zimmer returned to score the series having previously worked with the BBC Natural History Unit on both Seven Worlds, One Planet and Blue Planet II. On 27 August 2022, as part of the pre-launch publicity, it was revealed that vocals by Norwegian singer-songwriter Aurora would feature as part of the incidental music used during the series.

References

External links 

 Frozen Planet II at BBC Online
 Frozen Planet II at BBC Earth
 Frozen Planet II at IMDb
 Interview with executive producer Mark Brownlow at Discover Wildlife / BBC Wildlife magazine
 Frozen Planet II series trailer at YouTube

2022 British television series debuts
2022 British television series endings
2020s British documentary television series
BBC television documentaries
BBC high definition shows
Open University
Television series by BBC Studios
Environment of Antarctica
Arctic
Climate change mass media